Smoke On Records is an independent record label from Germany which mainly publishes hip-hop music. The label specializes mostly in re-releasing 1990s records as well as new albums. Smoke On Records has released such artists as Nine, Killah Priest, Das EFX, Blahzay Blahzay, Artifacts and more.

Discography

Albums

References

External links 
 Official Website 
 On Facebook 
 SoundCloud
 Smoke On Records  discogs

Hip hop record labels
German record labels
Record labels established in 2009